The TD Halifax Jazz Festival, formerly known as the Atlantic Jazz Festival, is the oldest jazz festival being held annually since 1987 and largest summer festival in Atlantic Canada. Designated a Hallmark Event by the Halifax Regional Municipality, the event spans two weekends (9 nights, 8 days), attracts up to 55,000 visitors, involves 450 volunteers and employs over 350 local musicians.

Core programming includes jazz music, complemented with presentations of world, roots, blues, Latin, R&B, and other music styles.

Lineups

2020
2020 event was scheduled to be held from July 7 to 12, 2020. In April 2020, it was announced that the festival was cancelled by its organizers following the COVID-19 pandemic. The event was later held online from July 31 to August 2, 2020.

2021
In 2021, online event was held from July 14 to August 15, marking the event's 35th anniversary.

2022
2022 event will be held from July 12 – 17 in downtown Halifax.

References 

Jazz festivals in Canada
Jazz_Festival
Jazz_Festival